The 1965 New York Giants season was the franchise's 41st season in the National Football League. The Giants were led by fifth-year head coach Allie Sherman and finished with a 7–7 record, which placed them in a tie for second in the Eastern Conference with the Dallas Cowboys, four games behind the Cleveland Browns. The Cowboys won both meetings with the Giants and gained the berth as the conference runner-up in the third place Playoff Bowl in Miami.

During the offseason, the Giants traded for quarterback Earl Morrall. New York began with two wins in their first three games, and held a 4–4 mark before a two-game losing streak. They won three of their next four games before losing the regular season finale, their second game against the Cowboys.

Morrall started all 14 games for the Giants, throwing 22 touchdown passes and 12 interceptions. Tucker Frederickson topped the team with 659 yards rushing; he had six touchdowns, including five on the ground. Joe Morrison led the with 41 receptions, while Homer Jones had a team-high 709 receiving yards and six touchdown catches. Defensively, Spider Lockhart and Dick Lynch each had four interceptions, and Jim Katcavage had 5.5 sacks to lead New York. Frederickson and tackle Rosey Brown were selected for the 1966 Pro Bowl.

Offseason 
 January 22, 1965: Y. A. Tittle, 38, announced his retirement from professional football.
 June 29, 1965: Giants president Jack Mara died at age 57.
 July 1965: Head coach Allie Sherman signed a ten-year contract, at $50,000 per year. He was fired in September 1969.

NFL Draft 
In the 1965 NFL draft, the Giants had the first overall selection and took running back Tucker Frederickson; future hall of famers taken later in the first round were Joe Namath, Gale Sayers, and Dick Butkus.

Roster

Schedule 

Notes: Intra-conference opponents are in bold text.

Game summaries

Week 1

Week 2

Standings

See also 
 1965 NFL season

References 

1960s in the Bronx
New York Giants
New York Giants
New York Giants seasons